Alonzo G. Decker Jr., also known as Al Decker, or A. G. Decker (1908 – 18 March 2002) was an American businessperson and engineer who served as the chairman of the board of Black & Decker. He is known for developing power tools for use in the home, including the first cordless electric drill, which helped create the do it yourself market.

Biography
Alonzo G. Decker Jr. was born in Maryland to Alonzo G. Decker Sr., co-founder of Black & Decker. He spent his early life in Towson, Maryland and graduated from the Baltimore Polytechnic Institute and Cornell University in electrical engineering.

He started his career with Black & Decker at the age of 14. Later, after his graduation, he became a member of the export department of Black & Decker. He continued to work with Black & Decker until depression when he lost his job. After losing his job, for a brief period, he sold soap flakes before rejoining Black & Decker as a floor sweeper.

In 1933, he became a research and manufacturing engineer at Black & Decker.

Throughout his life he was an active philanthropist.

References

1908 births
2002 deaths
20th-century American engineers
American chief executives
Cornell University College of Engineering alumni
Businesspeople from Baltimore
20th-century American businesspeople